Bibliothèques européennes de théologie (BETH; European Theological Libraries) is an ecumenical federation of European national theological library associations as well as single libraries. The association was founded in 1961 and has a legal registration in Kampen, Netherlands. BETH aims to contribute to the development of theological libraries in Europe by building networks, establishing contacts, supporting and promoting cooperation between European theological libraries, and working for the preservation of the rich cultural patrimony founded in them. BETH has member associations and libraries in 15 European countries. Each year BETH organizes an annual meeting in different European cities. The topics of the annual meetings reflect the challenges of modern theological librarianship like the future of the theological libraries, digitization, open access, information literacy, etc.

History 

These librarians were: Father Luchesius Smits (VKSB, Vereniging voor Seminarie- en Kloosterbibliothecarissen, The Netherlands), Father Francis Courtney (ABTAPL, United Kingdom), and Father Paul Mech (Association des bibliothèques de sciences religieuses, France). In the spirit of reconstruction and reconciliation that was characteristic for the period after the WW II, they wanted to contribute to the growth of the Christian faith by developing exchange between libraries specialized in religious studies. They considered it necessary to improve the professional level of these libraries, to work on international bibliographies, and to work together for their common objectives. "They considered it as an apostolic mission not just to take responsibility of the conservation of the valuable collections of the books of the seminaries and monasteries, but also to make them available to a wider audience."

It was in Frankfurt, however, four years later, on 18 October 1961 at a meeting of German theological libraries that the International Committee for the Coordination of Catholic Theological Library Associations (le Comité international de coordination des associations de bibliothèques de théologie catholique) was established. This committee brought together librarians from Germany, France and the Netherlands and had a rather informal structure. After some ten years, the members decided to create a formal association. In 1970, the ‘Committee’ became the International Council of Theological Library Associations (le Conseil international des associations de bibliothèques de théologie) and included several national associations. The statutes of the new association were adopted in a meeting held on the 26th of September 1973, and the association received royal approval in the Netherlands. The secretarial office of the association was in Nijmegen.

During the following years, several national associations joined the Council, which, in turn, joined IFLA (1971-1986).

From 1961 to 1999 several joint publications speak for the common efforts of the council: Scripta recenter edita, which is current bibliography of philosophical and theological works, was published from 1950 to 1973, and Bibliographia ad usum seminariorum, a selection of the necessary tools for theological studies (liturgical, missiological, ecumenical) from 1959 to 1965.

Very soon after its creation, the International Council of Theological Library Associations began to publish a listing of science of religion periodicals, both active and terminated ones, that were in collections of its member libraries. The members of the national associations made a thorough survey of libraries in their countries to clarify the history of each title, and then these files were circulated among the other members who could supplement, correct and localize the data. This effort that was started back in the 1960s was laborious and took a long time. Out of this work emerged only one single publication, Clavis foliorum periodicorum, which covered the periodicals in Belgium, the Netherlands, and Luxemburg and was published in 1994 by Peeters. 
 
Carried on more or less effective in the different member countries, this project was finished at the beginning of the 2000s at the same time when the old catalogues were digitized and new digital catalogues were created. Although the project was halted in its initial stage, it provided the national associations with a tool that could be used by their member libraries.

In 1999, the council, to emphasize the specifically European character of its activities, changed the name of the association into BETH: Bibliothèques Européennes de Théologie / European Theological Libraries / Europäische Bibliotheken für Theologie, equipped with a website that is until today administrated by the Leuven Catholic University (KULeuven).

Related Organizations and Partners

American Theological Library Association 
The cooperation between Atla and BETH was started in 1969. Atla offers invaluable high-level academic services for its client libraries by keeping up, among other things, the Atla RDB index of journal articles and full-text journal database Atlas. Atla organizes annually a conference, which offers the librarians working in theological and religion science libraries an opportunity to meet their colleagues, work together with them, develop common projects, create consortiums, and improve their practices. Each year, some members of BETH visit the annual conference of Atla, and Atla, in turn, participates actively in the annual conferences of BETH. The ties between these two associations are particularly close. The client libraries of BETH promote the Atla databases and teach the staff and students to use them.

Relindial 
BETH has also participated in the creation of IFLA's special interest group Relindial (IFLA; Religions: libraries and dialogue). This group was officially established on 2 April 2012, with the aim to promote interreligious and intercultural dialogue in and through libraries. Odile Dupont, who was the president of BETH at the time (2007-2012), was also the first convenor of Relindial. At the annual conferences of BETH, a report on the activities of Relindial is presented and discussed.

The Lyon Declaration 
In September 2015, BETH signed the Lyon Declaration on access to information and development, launched by IFLA in August 2014. The Lyon Declaration calls “upon the Member States of the United Nations to make an international commitment to use the post-2015 development agenda to ensure that everyone has access to, and is able to understand, use and share the information that is necessary to promote sustainable development and democratic societies”.

Name and Logo 

In Hebrew, Beth ב is the second letter of the alphabet and the first letter found when opening the Biblical text, the word Bereshit (in the beginning). The word BETH conveys the idea of a house, dwelling, building.

In 2008, a Hungarian artist, István Burai(1951-2017), designed the first logo of the association, which expressed the tradition of study and of the lectio divina set on a lectern. It also represented the contemporary librarian's job with the keys of a keyboard on which we see the letters of the acronym of the association.

In 2020, after a public contest, the board of BETH adopted a new logo, designed by Croatian designers Ivana Čukelj and Iva Đaković. The letter beth represents the open door of inclusiveness and flow of information and knowledge. The acronym letters are so positioned that they represent different theological libraries coming from all sides of Europe.

Ordinary Members - European Theological Library Associations 

 Belgium: Expertisehouders Levensbeschouwelijke Collecties (VRB)
 Finland: Finnish Theological Library Association (FTLA)
 France: L’Association des Bibliothèques Chrétiennes de France (ABCF) 
 Germany:
 
 
 Italy:
 
 Unione Romana Biblioteche Ecclesiastiche (URBE)
 Hungary: Egyházy Könyvtárak Egyesülése (EKE)
 Netherlands: Vereniging voor het Theologisch Bibliothecariaat (VThB)
 Norway: Forum for teologiske og religionsfaglige bibliotek (FTRB)
 Poland: 
 Spain: Asociación de Bibliotecarios de la Iglesia en España (ABIE)
 Sweden: Network for Theological Libraries in Sweden (NTBS)
 Switzerland: BibRel.ch
 UK & Ireland: Association of British Theological and Philosophical Libraries (ABTAPL)

Extraordinary Members - European Theological Libraries 

 Bibliothèque de théologie – Université catholique de Louvain
 Maurits Sabbe Library, KU Leuven
 Biblijski Institut, Zagreb, Croatia
 Bibliothèque municipale de Lyon , La Collection jésuite des Fontaines
 Bibliothèque Nationale et Universitaire de Strasbourg
 Bibliothèque de Port-Royal, Paris. France
 Institut catholique de Paris
 Erzbischöfliche Diözesan- und Dombibliothek Köln 
 Tübingen University Library
 The Theological and College Library of the Transtibiscan Reformed Church District, Hungary
 Pontifical North American College , Rome, Italy
 IBTS Centre Amsterdam
 Library of Theological Pentecostal Institute, Buchurest, Romania
 The World Council of Churches’ Library, Geneva, Switzerland

References

External links 
 Official website

Library-related organizations